Traitors Island is an uninhabited island off the western coast of Australia, near the site of the Batavia shipwreck.  About 50 metres long, it is situated near Beacon Island and is part of the Wallabi Group within the Houtman Abrolhos.

History
The island received its name from those who were left behind by a number of the crew that set sail for Batavia after their ship of the same name ran aground on reef in 1629.  Those who remained on the island felt so betrayed by the desertion of those who left for Batavia that they named the land Traitor's Island.

References

Wallabi Group
Uninhabited islands of Australia